Mohammad Naeem (born 4 September 1990) is a Pakistani first-class cricketer who plays for Abbottabad cricket team.

References

External links
 

1990 births
Living people
Pakistani cricketers
Abbottabad cricketers
Khyber Pakhtunkhwa cricketers
Cricketers from Mardan
Water and Power Development Authority cricketers